Khij or KHIJ may refer to:
 Khij, Razavi Khorasan, a village in Iran
 Khij, Semnan, a village in Iran
 KHIJ-LP, a radio station (106.3 FM) in Ottumwa, Iowa
 KYLI, a radio station (96.7 FM) in Bunkerville, Nevada, which held the call sign KHIJ from 2008 to 2011

See also
 Kalateh Khij, a town in Iran